Haplochromis pappenheimi is a species of cichlid found in the Democratic Republic of the Congo and Uganda where it occurs in Lake Edward, Lake George and the Kazinga Channel.  This species can reach a length of  SL. The specific name honours the curator of fishes at the Royal Museum, Berlin Paul Pappenheim (1878-1945), who was the co-author of the paper in which this species was described.

References

pappenheimi
Fish described in 1914
Taxonomy articles created by Polbot